The 2021 Euro Winners Cup was the ninth edition of the Euro Winners Cup (EWC), an annual continental beach soccer tournament for men's top-division European clubs. The championship is the sport's version of the better known UEFA Champions League in association football.

Organised by Beach Soccer Worldwide (BSWW), the tournament was held in Nazaré, Portugal from 12–18 July.

The event began with a round robin group stage. At its conclusion, the best teams progressed to the knockout stage, a series of single elimination games to determine the winners, starting with the Round of 32 and ending with the final. Consolation matches were also played to determine other final rankings.

Kristall of Russia were the defending champions and successfully defended their title, defeating Braga in the final in what was a repeat of the concluding match of the last edition. This moved Kristall clear of Braga in terms of the most titles won, with four.

Teams

Qualification
Usually, to enter automatically, a club needed to be the champions of their country's most recent national championship (and for Europe's strongest leagues, the runners-up and third placed clubs can also enter). Any club that didn't meet these requirement was entitled to enter the accompanying Euro Winners Challenge (preliminary round) to take place in the days prior to the competition proper, as a last opportunity to qualify for the EWC main round.

But as like last year, due to the effect of the COVID-19 pandemic on the competition, the normal rules regarding qualification were abandoned. The Euro Winners Challenge (preliminary round) did not take place; entry restrictions were relaxed: the event was opened up to simply any European club that wished to participate. All clubs entered straight into the group stage.

Entrants
50 clubs from 16 different nations entered the event.

Key: H: Hosts \ TH: Title holders

Venues

Four venues are used in one host city: Nazaré, Leiria District, Portugal.

Matches took place at Praia de Nazaré (Nazaré Beach) on one of four pitches. One seated arena, the Estádio do Viveiro (Viveiro Stadium), and three purpose made pitches, located adjacent to the main stadium, simply known as Pitch 2, Pitch 3 and Pitch 4.

Draw
The draw to split the 50 clubs into 13 groups (11 of four and two of three) took place at 13:00 CEST (UTC+2) on 7 July at BSWW's headquarters in Barcelona, Spain.

Group stage
The top two teams from each group, and the best six third places teams, advanced to the round of 32.

All kickoff times are local, WEST (UTC+1) and were those scheduled; actual times may have differed slightly.

Group A

Group B

Group C

Group D

Group E

Group F

Group G

Group H

Group I

Group J

Group K

Group L

Group M

Ranking of third-placed teams
Since Groups K and M consisted of three teams, for the third placed teams from Groups A–J and L, their results against the teams finishing in fourth place in their groups were discounted for this ranking.

Knockout stage

Bracket (last 16 onwards)

Round of 32

Draw
The draw to determine the round of 32 ties and composition of the knockout stage bracket took place on 14 July after the conclusion of all group stage matches.

The 32 clubs were split into four pots of eight based on their group stage performance, with the best performing clubs placed in Pot 1 down to the worst performing octet in Pot 4. Teams from Pot 1 were drawn against teams from Pot 4; teams from Pot 2 were drawn against teams from Pot 3. The drawing of ties alternated as such and were allocated to the bracket from top to bottom in the order they were drawn.

Matches

Round of 16

Quarter-finals

9th–16th place

1st–8th place

Semi-finals

13th–16th place

9th–12th place

5th–8th place

1st–4th place

Finals

15th place match

13th place match

11th place match

9th place match

7th place match

5th place match

3rd place match

Final

Awards
The following individual awards were presented after the final.

Top goalscorers
Players with at least seven goals are listed.

18 goals
 Bernardo Lopes ( GRAP)

16 goals
 Edson Hulk ( Rosh HaAyin)

15 goals
 Marian Măciucă ( Spartak Varna)

14 goals
 Lucão ( Braga)

13 goals
 Eudin ( Kfar Qassem)

12 goals

 Aleh Hapon ( Nistru Chișinău)
 Chiky Ardil ( CB Loures)
 Andrei Pankratov ( Delta Saratov)
 Andrey Kotenev ( Krylya Sovetov)

10 goals

 Hugo Liborio ( CB Caldas Rainha)
 Diogo Oliveira ( GRAP)
 Duarte Vivo ( ACD O Sótão)
 Filipe da Silva ( Braga)

9 goals

 Dejan Stankovic ( Viareggio)
 Nikolai Kryshanov ( Delta Saratov)
 Anatoliy Ryabko ( Real Münster)
 Rodrigo ( Kristall)

8 goals

 Lansana Diassy ( Marseille BT)
 Stéphane Belhomme ( La Grande-Motte Pyramide)
 Amar Yatim ( Kfar Qassem)
 Miguel Pintado ( CB Loures)
 Joscha Metzler ( Real Münster)
 Fedor Zemskov ( Lokomotiv Moscow)
 Boris Nikonorov ( Lokomotiv Moscow)
 Bê Martins ( Braga)
 Léo Martins ( Braga)

7 goals

 Llorenç Gómez ( San Francisco)
 Victor Angeletti ( La Grande-Motte Pyramide)
 Serhii Dubovyk ( Molniya)
 Camilo Augusto ( Kfar Qassem)
 André Pinto ( CB Loures)
 Fabinho ( ACD O Sótão)
 Sven Körner ( Rostocker Robben)
 Catarino ( Real Münster)
 Oleg Zborovskyi ( Artur Music)
 Roman Pachev ( Artur Music)

Source: BSWW

Final standings

See also
2021 Women's Euro Winners Cup
2020–21 UEFA Futsal Champions League

References

External links
Euro Winners Cup 2021, at Beach Soccer Worldwide
Euro Winners Cup 2021, at ZeroZero.pt (in Portuguese)
Men's Euro Winners Cup 2021, at BS Russia (in Russian)

Euro Winners Cup
2021 in beach soccer
Euro
2021
Nazaré, Portugal
Euro Winners Cup